Allan Anderson Brown (15 November 1924 – 9 June 2014) was an Australian rules footballer who played for the Collingwood Football Club in the Victorian Football League (VFL). His career ended prematurely due to a knee injury.

Notes

External links 

Profile on Collingwood Forever

1924 births
2014 deaths
Australian rules footballers from Victoria (Australia)
Collingwood Football Club players
People educated at Northcote High School